The Zürcher Museums-Bahn (ZMB) is a heritage railway association based in the Swiss city of Zurich. It operates occasional services over the Sihltal line of the Sihltal Zürich Uetliberg Bahn, and preserves rolling stock, much of which formerly belonged to that operator. 

On the last Sunday of every month from April to October, a steam service is operated from Zurich Wiedikon station to Sihlbrugg station. The ZMB preserves a selection of former Sihltal line rolling stock, including two early steam locomotives, and a railcar and a locomotive built for the original electrification.

See also
List of heritage railways and funiculars in Switzerland

References

External links 
 The Zürcher Museums-Bahn web site 

Heritage railways in Switzerland
Railway lines in Switzerland
Transport in the canton of Zürich